Togo–Turkey relations are the foreign relations between Togo and Turkey. Turkey embassy opened in Lomé.

Diplomatic Relations 
Turkey and Togo enjoy good bilateral relations.  However, relations cooled in early 1980s when Gnassingbé Eyadéma became increasingly more heavy-handed and authoritarian, judged as having Africa's worst human rights record. Turkey was critical of Gnassingbé Eyadéma's re-election in August 1993 in a contest boycotted by other candidates. Relations improved in 1994, when Gnassingbé Eyadéma appointed Edem Kodjo, an Ewe leader of  Rassemblement du Peuple Togolais from Kpalimé who came third in the election with 7 seats, as Prime Minister.

Presidential Visits

Economic Relations 
 Trade volume between the two countries was 109 million USD in 2019.

Educational Relations 
Turkey has been providing scholarships to Togolese students since 1992.

See also 

 Foreign relations of Togo
 Foreign relations of Turkey

References 

Togo–Turkey relations
Turkey
Bilateral relations of Turkey